Sarah Myriam Mazouz (born 29 April 1987) is a Gabonese judoka. She competed at the 2016 Summer Olympics in the women's 78 kg event, in which she was eliminated in the second round by Natalie Powell.

In 2019, she won one of the bronze medals in the women's 78 kg event at the 2019 African Judo Championships held in Cape Town, South Africa. She also won the gold medal in the women's 78 kg event at the 2019 African Games.

She competed in the women's 78 kg event at the 2020 Summer Olympics.

References

External links

 
 
 

1987 births
Living people
People from Haut-Ogooué Province
Gabonese female judoka
Olympic judoka of Gabon
Judoka at the 2016 Summer Olympics
Judoka at the 2020 Summer Olympics
Competitors at the 2019 African Games
African Games gold medalists for Gabon
African Games medalists in judo
21st-century Gabonese people
Gabonese people of Algerian descent
Sportspeople of Algerian descent